Joseph Michael Cross (born May 28, 1986) is an American actor and producer. He began work as a child actor, starring in the 1998 films Desperate Measures, Wide Awake, and Jack Frost. He won the Satellite Award for Best Actor – Motion Picture for Running with Scissors (2006), and co-starred in Flags of Our Fathers (2006), Untraceable (2008), Milk (2008), and Lincoln (2012).

From 1999 to 2004, Cross starred as Casey Hughes in the CBS soap opera As the World Turns. In 2017, he appeared in the HBO limited series Big Little Lies and the Netflix crime drama series Mindhunter.

Early life
Cross was born in New Brunswick, New Jersey, the son of Maureen (née Toumey), a real estate agent, and Michael J. Cross, who worked in marketing. He has four siblings. Cross grew up in Pelham, New York, and attended Pelham Middle School and Pelham Memorial High School. For his undergraduate studies, Cross transferred from Hartford's Trinity College to Columbia University.

Career
As a child actor, Cross appeared in the Disney Channel Original television film Northern Lights (1997), and starred in the action-thriller Desperate Measures, comedy-drama Wide Awake, and Christmas fantasy film Jack Frost, all of which were released in 1998. He subsequently appeared in several television roles, notably portraying Casey Hughes in the CBS daytime soap opera As the World Turns (1999–2004).

In 2006, Cross played the young Augusten Burroughs in Running with Scissors, a drama also featuring Annette Bening and Evan Rachel Wood, and appeared as real-life Marine Franklin Sousley in the big-budget Flags of Our Fathers, a Clint Eastwood-directed war film. Cross has said that he enjoyed the transition from appearing in Running with Scissors, which he has described as "very character driven and smaller" to the high-profile "epic" Flags of Our Fathers. Running with Scissors has been described by media sources as his "breakout performance", and he was nominated for the Critics' Choice Movie Award for Best Young Performer and won the Satellite Award for Best Actor – Motion Picture Musical or Comedy.

In 2008, Cross starred in the thriller film Untraceable (2008) with Diane Lane, and portrayed gay rights activist Dick Pabich in the Academy Award-nominated Harvey Milk biopic Milk (2008). He won the Critics' Choice Movie Award for Best Acting Ensemble with his Milk co-stars. The following year, he played William "Fred" Parsons in the West End production of Breakfast at Tiffany's, at the Theatre Royal Haymarket, opposite Anna Friel. In 2012, Cross had a leading role as Declan Truss in Doug Karr's comedy film Art Machine. He portrayed the lead role of Davis Green in the drama film The Automatic Hate (2015), alongside Deborah Ann Woll. He portrayed the lead role of Lernert in the science-fiction film Everything Beautiful Is Far Away (2017), alongside Julia Garner. Cross made his directorial debut with the coming-of-age film Summer Night (2019), executive produced by James Ponsoldt.

Filmography

Film

Television

References

External links
 

1986 births
20th-century American male actors
21st-century American male actors
Male actors from New Jersey
Male actors from New York (state)
American male child actors
American male film actors
American male soap opera actors
American male stage actors
American male television actors
Columbia University alumni
Living people
People from New Brunswick, New Jersey
People from Pelham, New York